is a Japanese singer, actor and television personality. He is the leader of the idol group King & Prince. His film and television roles have included Toi in Oniichan, Gacha, Yūsuke Kaji in Defying Kurosaki-kun, Shu Maiko in Nisekoi, Arata Fukazawa in Night Doctor and Inokichi Myojin in Hissatsu Shigotonin.

Early life 
Kishi was born in Saitama Prefecture, Japan. He played baseball in elementary school.

Career 
Kishi joined the Japanese talent agency Johnny & Associates on 20 July 2009, when he was in his second year of middle school. He performed in Koichi Domoto's musical Endless Shock for three consecutive years from 2013 to 2015. In 2015, Kishi was selected as a member of Mr. King vs Mr. Prince and its subunit Mr. Prince (later Prince). The group debuted in 2018.

Kishi made his TV drama debut in Kamen Teacher in 2013 as Shishimaru, one of key students. The following year, he appeared in Kin Kyori Renai, an adaptation of the manga series of the same name. Kishi's first lead role was in Oniichan, Gacha, opposite Rio Suzuki. For his performance, he won the TVnavi Drama of the Year award for Best New Actor. Kishi starred as Masaya in the NHK TV drama Oedo Robocon in 2017. He played a high school student who traveled back in Edo era and joined a Karakuri puppet contest using his skills. In 2021, he starred in the drama Night Doctor, alongside Haru and Kei Tanaka. His performance won him the Nikkan Sports Drama Grand Prix Award for Best Supporting Actor.

Acting credits

Theater

TV drama

Film

Advertisements

TV Shows

Awards

References

External links

21st-century Japanese male actors
1995 births
Living people